The A508 is a short A-class road for north–south journeys in central and south central England, forming the route from Market Harborough in Leicestershire, via Northampton, to Old Stratford, just outside Milton Keynes (and the Buckinghamshire border).

Route

Market HarboroughNorthampton M1 
The road begins in the centre of Market Harborough and crosses into Northamptonshire just outside the town.  Crossing the A14 at Kelmarsh, it continues on through the centre of Northampton, merging with the A5199 as it enters the town. Through Northampton the road repeatedly switches between being a dual carriageway and a single carriageway. South of the town centre, it route-shares with the A45 between Wooton and the M1 at junction 15.

M1 A5
Regaining its identity south of the M1 junction, it continues through Roade, Grafton Regis and rural south Northamptonshire, ending in a five-way roundabout with the A5 and the A422 and a local road into Old Stratford, a Northamptonshire village just across the River Great Ouse from Milton Keynes (Buckinghamshire). , a bypass is being built around Roade as part of enabling works for the rail freight interchange under construction between Roade and the M1.

History

Former Routes

Bypasses & Realignments

References 

Roads in England
Transport in Leicestershire
Transport in Northamptonshire